Nelson Ned Previdente (14 February 1960), better known as Nelson Barbudo is a Brazilian politician and rural producer, affiliated to the PSL.

Biography

Nelson Barbudo gained notoriety through content disseminated via social networks defending the positions of the then federal deputy Jair Bolsonaro. He was the most voted federal deputy in the state of Mato Grosso in the 2018 elections.

Barbudo is Roman Catholic.

References

External Links
 Profile in the Chamber of Deputies

1960 births
Living people
Brazilian Roman Catholics
Conservatism in Brazil
Social Liberal Party (Brazil) politicians
Democrats (Brazil) politicians
Members of the Chamber of Deputies (Brazil) from Mato Grosso
People from Monte Aprazível